Lethrinus microdon is a species of emperor fish. It is a marine fish, bluish-grey or brown in colour with pale or somewhat orange fins. This species is reef-associated and is often found in small schools, occasionally with Lethrinus olivaceus at depths of 10 to 80 metres. It is widespread in the Indo-West Pacific and other waters. This species is caught commercially and is considered to be an excellent food fish.

Common names
Common names include the following, or variants thereof:
 Smalltooth emperor
 Longface emperor
 Longnosed emperor 
 Pigface bream

Description
This species is bluish-grey or brown in colour with pale or somewhat orange fins, and has a moderately long snout. It commonly has dark, scattered, irregular blotches on its sides. Some specimens have three streaks of dark colouration radiating away from the eye toward the snout. It is a relatively elongate fish and grows to a maximum length of approximately 70 cm, but is commonly recorded at between 30 and 50 cm in length.

Distribution
Lethrinus microdon is a widespread species. It has been recorded in the Red Sea, Persian Gulf, Arabian Sea, from East Africa to Sri Lanka, in the Ryukyu Islands as well as Papua New Guinea.

Habitat
This fish is non-migratory and is found over sandy bottoms near reefs. It forms small schools, occasionally with Lethrinus olivaceus, and has a maximum depth range of approximately 10 to 80 metres.

Diet
Lethrinus microdon feeds in the day and at night, and is known to feed mainly on other fishes, cephalopods, crustaceans, and polychaetes.

Human uses
This species is fished commercially and is considered to be an excellent food fish. It is usually marketed fresh and not frozen. It is known to be caught using gill nets, trawls, handlines, and fish traps.

References

External links
 

Lethrinidae
Fish described in 1830